Talal Yousef Mohammed (born 24 February 1975), known mainly as Talal Yousef, is a former Bahraini footballer.

Yousef played mainly as an attacking midfielder and sometimes as a striker. He is currently retired from playing with the Bahrain national football team, where he made 21 appearances in FIFA World Cup qualifying matches.

Early career
Talal started his career with Isa Town, where he also captained. He met Salman Isa, another legend of Bahraini football, at the club. After some amazing performances, he was noticed by Bahrain Riffa Club. They signed him along with Isa for an undisclosed fee.

Al Riffa Club
After signing for Al Riffa (Riffa Club), Talal Yousef made a huge impact. He helped them to the league title and the Crown Prince Cup and established himself as the superstar of Al Riffa.

Asian Cup
During the 2004 Asian Cup, Talal Yousef peaked and put on his best performances. He scored two goals, one coming from his trademark free kick against fierce rivals Iran in the 3rd and 4th place playoff. Talal Yousif was named in the team of the tournament along with fellow Bahraini's A'ala Hubail, who was joint top scorer, and Mohamed Salmeen .In this tournament the Bahraini National Team had their best ever performance at a major tournament as they reached the semi finals. Talal Yousif was a major part of that success and after the tournament he was named Captain of the National team.

Kuwait
After the Asian Cup success, many of Bahrain's top players headed for Qatar although Talal opted for a move to Kuwait. He was later joined by Bahraini defender Hussain Ali Baba, also a former Al Riffa player. When Kuwait SC did not renew his contract, he then signed with Qadsiya for the 2007/08 season.

Awards
2004 Asian Cup – All-Star Team

Retirement
Talal announced his official retirement from International Football in January 2006, then was convinced to return and helped Bahrain qualify for the Asian Cup 2007. He also stayed on for the 18th & 19th GCC Cup's and then announced his final retirement from International Competitions.

Goals for Senior National Team

References

External links

1975 births
Living people
Bahraini footballers
Bahrain international footballers
Expatriate footballers in Kuwait
2004 AFC Asian Cup players
2007 AFC Asian Cup players
Association football midfielders
Kuwait SC players
Kuwait Premier League players
Qadsia SC players
Bahraini expatriate sportspeople in Kuwait
Bahraini expatriate footballers
Riffa SC players
Bahraini Premier League players